Monas Hieroglyphica (or The Hieroglyphic Monad) is a book by John Dee, the Elizabethan magus and court astrologer of Elizabeth I of England, published in Antwerp in 1564. It is an exposition of the meaning of an esoteric symbol that he invented.

Reception and influence
The book received little notice in English sources, though it is praised in the 1591 edition of George Ripley's The Compound of Alchymy as well as in Elias Ashmole’s Theatrum  Chemicum  Britannicum (1652). A number of references appear in other languages, for example, Jean-Jacques  Manget’s Bibliotheca Chemica Curiosa (1702) and Lazarus Zetzner’s Theatrum Chemicum (1602; 1659–1661); the latter reproduces the Monas Hieroglyphica in its entirety.

Gerard Dorn's Judgement of the Spagiric Art of Johann Trithemius contains terms and phrases based on the Monas, and his commentary on the Tractatus  Aureus references the words ("Vulgaris, Hic, Oculus caligabit, diffidetque plurimum") accompanying a figure in the Monas, saying "with the eyes of the mind, for the vulgar eye, as John Dee of London says, will here find fault and be most distrustful." Peter Forshaw suggests that it is likely that Dorn's use of the same line and circle figure in his Monarchia Physica or Monarchia Triadis, in Unitate (1577) is a reference to the figure in Dee. It is also reproduced in the English logician, mathematician, and medic Thomas  Oliver’s  De  Sophismatum  praestigijs cauendis admonitio (1604). His further comments in the work suggest that he was also familiar with Dee’s "Mathematicall Praeface" to Billingsley’s translation of Euclid’s Elements of Geometrie (1570).

Giulio Cesare Capaccio refers to the Monas in his Delle imprese (On devices) (1592), paraphrasing content from the preface and mentioning the 'recondite Kabbalistic philosophy’ of 'Giovanni Dee da Londino.' Cesare della Riviera includes Dee's glyph, without attribution, in his Il Mondo Magico de gli Heroi (1605). The glyph is also reproduced in the Amphitheatrum  sapientiae  aeternae (1595; 1609) of Heinrich Khunrath, where it is used in a more alchemical context. 

The glyph was adopted by the Rosicrucians and appears on a page of the Rosicrucian Manifesto, The Chymical Wedding of Christian Rosenkreutz (1616), beside the text of the invitation to the Royal Wedding given to Rosenkreutz who narrates the work.
Frances Yates notes that Dee's influence later "spread to Puritanism in the New World through John Winthrop Jr., an alchemist and a follower of Dee; Winthrop used the 'monas' as his personal mark."

Publications

English translations

See also
Alchemical symbol
Astrological symbols
List of occult symbols
Magical formula
Renaissance magic

Notes

References

Citations

Works cited

Primary sources

Secondary sources

Further reading

External links
 Monas Hieroglyphica at Esotericarchives.com
 
 Monas Hieroglyphica at the Library of Congress

1564 books
Alchemical symbols
Christian Kabbalah
John Dee
Occult books
Magic symbols
Religious symbols
Western esotericism